This is a list of Cathartiformes species by global population. While numbers are estimates, they have been made by the experts in their fields. For more information on how these estimates were ascertained, see Wikipedia's articles on population biology and population ecology. This list is not comprehensive- the Greater yellow-headed vulture, the Turkey vulture, and theAmerican black vulture have not yet had their populations estimated.

Species by global population

References